Viktor Mikhailovich Igumenov (born 10 March 1943) is a Russian former wrestler who competed in the 1968 Summer Olympics and in the 1972 Summer Olympics and won five world titles.

References

External links
 

1943 births
Living people
Olympic wrestlers of the Soviet Union
Wrestlers at the 1968 Summer Olympics
Wrestlers at the 1972 Summer Olympics
Russian male sport wrestlers
20th-century Russian people